The Hubbard River,  long, is part of the Farmington River watershed. It flows through Connecticut and Massachusetts.

It is named for Samuel Hubbard, the English colonist who came to the area, operating a saw mill near the river in 1749. The river heads in Tolland, Massachusetts, at the junction of Babcock Brook and Hall Pond Brook, then flows southeast across Granville, Massachusetts to Barkhamsted Reservoir in the town of Hartland, Connecticut.

Tributaries
Babcock Brook, Hall Pond Brook, Halfway Brook and Pond Brook

See also
List of rivers of Connecticut

References

Rivers of Hampden County, Massachusetts
Rivers of Hartford County, Connecticut
Rivers of Massachusetts
Rivers of Connecticut
Tributaries of the Connecticut River